The BR Standard Class 3 2-6-0 was a class of mixed traffic steam locomotive designed by Robert Riddles for British Railways. It was essentially a hybrid design, the chassis being closely based on and sharing a number of parts with the LMS Ivatt Class 4, and having a boiler derived from a GWR No.2 boiler as fitted to the GWR Large Prairie 2-6-2T and 5600 Class 0-6-2T tank engines.

Design details
The design and construction took place at the ex-Great Western Railway Swindon Works, along with the 2-6-2 tank engine version of the class, though some details were designed at Brighton, Derby and Doncaster. Although the boiler shared flanged plates with the GWR No.2 boiler the barrel was shortened by  inches and a dome added. Strangely the class did not share the same design of wheels as the Doncaster-designed BR Standard Class 4 2-6-0, however both shared the  driving wheels and the same piston stroke, and hence crank-pin throw.

In common with a number of the other BR Standard Classes, the chassis design used a number of LMS-designed components including Brake Hanger Brackets, Flexible Stretcher Brackets and Reversing Shaft Brackets.

The cylinder covers of engines as built were fitted with "screw-in" type pressure relief valves. From September 1955 revised cylinder covers were introduced for renewals incorporating "bolt-on" type pressure relief valves.

Although the chassis had many almost identical parts to the LMS Ivatt Class 4 the motion brackets were derived from the design of those fitted to the LMS Ivatt Class 2 2-6-0 and LMS Ivatt Class 2 2-6-2T.

Unlike a number of the larger BR Standards the exhaust steam manifold within the smokebox saddle was a steel fabrication that was part of the welded saddle. In a number of the large BR standards (BR Standard Class 6 and Class 7 engines) the exhaust steam manifold was a steel casting welded into the saddle during manufacture.

Service
Only 20 were built, numbers 77000–77019, all at Swindon Works.  Due to their small number, the class were the antithesis of 'standard' engines and it would probably have been better to build more 2-6-0s to the Standard Class 4 and Standard Class 2 designs instead. None has survived to preservation, though some components were saved from scrapyards for use on a project to build a new Standard Class 3 2-6-2T. This class was the last class of steam locomotive on British Railways to remain complete before suffering its first withdrawal.

Operation
Their operations were mainly restricted to the North Eastern and Scottish Regions, of British Railways, although 77014 ended its days on the Southern Region as it was transferred from Northwich depot on the London Midland Region to Guildford depot on the Southern Region in March 1966; it was withdrawn in July 1967.

Other than this operation was in some more remote areas, such as 77011 which worked the Haltwhistle - Alston line from 1955.

Withdrawal

References

Citations

References

Bibliography

External links 

 Class BR3/1 Details at Rail UK
 BR Standard Class 3MT 2-6-0 (SEMG article)

3
2-6-0 locomotives
Railway locomotives introduced in 1954
Scrapped locomotives
Standard gauge steam locomotives of Great Britain